Thomas Alexander Murphy (May 8, 1885 – February 27, 1966) was an Irish-born politician in Ontario, Canada. He represented Beaches in the Legislative Assembly of Ontario from 1926 to 1948 as a Conservative and later Progressive Conservative member.

Biography
He was born in Lurgan and was educated in Toronto. He worked for the Water Works Department for the city of Toronto from 1906 to 1923. In 1911, Murphy married Sarah Allister Kirkpatrick. He was chair of the Ontario Athletic Commission and president of the Canadian Association of Oarsmen. Murphy also served as vice-president of the National Boxing Association; he was defeated when he ran for reelection in 1928, which led to the Ontario Boxing Federation withdrawing from the National Boxing Association.

Murphy was defeated by Reid Scott when he ran for reelection to the Ontario assembly in 1948. He died in Toronto in 1966 at the age of 80.

References

External links

1885 births
1966 deaths
Progressive Conservative Party of Ontario MPPs
Irish emigrants to Canada (before 1923)